Biff à la Lindström is a Swedish dish made from onion, potato, red beet, capers, and ground beef, which is made into patties and fried.

Origin 
Although the name Lindström sounds Swedish, the inclusion of beets and capers makes it likely that the dish originates in Russia. A common story is that the dish was invented by a Finnish soldier Henrik Lindström (1831–1910), who was born and raised in Saint Petersburg. He supposedly visited Hotel Witt in Kalmar on May 4, 1862, where he wanted to treat his friends to a meal he used to eat in Russia. He ordered the ingredients needed from the kitchen, and the guests were instructed by Lindström on how to make the patties. The patties were then brought back to the kitchen, where they were fried, and then served. The dish was promptly added to the hotel's menu. The dish remains on the hotel's menu.

Another story attributes the dish to Adolf Henrik Lindstrøm, the chef that accompanied both Fridtjof Nansen and Roald Amundsen on their missions to the poles and through the Northwest Passage.

References

Beef dishes
Swedish cuisine